Nele Reimer (born 9 September 1996) is a German handballer who plays for SG BBM Bietigheim.

Achievements
DHB-Pokal:
Winner: 2016

References
  

1996 births
Living people
Sportspeople from Rostock
German female handball players